WRBS may refer to:
 
 WRBS-FM, a radio station (95.1 FM) licensed to Baltimore, Maryland, United States
 WRBS (AM), a radio station (1230 AM) licensed to Baltimore, Maryland, United States